is a Japanese manga series written and illustrated by Ryuhei Tamura. It was serialized in Shueisha's Weekly Shōnen Jump from June 2020 to June 2021. The series was published digitally in English by Viz Media.

Plot summary
Trouble-making police detective Boyle Samejima, who is not averse to breaking rules to get the job done, is transferred from Shinjuku, Tokyo to the laid-back Ogasawara Islands. That little girl, Chako, has recently returned with a humanoid dolphin named Orpheus, whom she calls "Papa." Orpheus joins the police department on the same day as Samejima, as his partner and superior.

Characters

Boyle is a cop who tries to play, "The Loose Cannon". Though rough around the edges, he does take his job seriously, and will put the lives of others first. He is often called by his nickname Shark.

A humanoid Dolphin and Boyle's partner. Like Boyle, his is rough around the edges, but still someone who would risk his life to protect others. He has all the abilities of a dolphin enhanced to superhuman levels.

The oracle of the cult of the sea. She is very much like a child with an active imagination, but has the strange ability to evolve sea life into humanoid forms, but she is not aware she has this power.

Publication
Hard-Boiled Cop and Dolphin is written and illustrated by Ryuhei Tamura. The manga was serialized in Shueisha's Weekly Shōnen Jump from June 27, 2020 to June 21, 2021. Shueisha collected its chapters in five tankōbon volumes, released from November 4, 2020, to October 4, 2021.

The series is published digitally in English language by Viz Media. Viz Media started releasing its volumes digitally on November 23, 2021.

Volume list

References

External links
 

Adventure anime and manga
Bonin Islands
Comedy anime and manga
Fantasy anime and manga
Fiction about dolphins
Police in anime and manga
Shōnen manga
Shueisha manga
Viz Media manga